This article shows the rosters of all participating teams at the 2015–16 Men's Volleyball Serie A1 in Italy.

Calzedonia Verona
The following is the Calzedonia Verona roster in the 2015–16 Men's Volleyball Serie A1.

CMC Romagna
The following is the CMC Romagna roster in the 2015–16 Men's Volleyball Serie A1.

Cucine Lube Civitanova
The following is the Cucine Lube Civitanova roster in the 2015–16 Men's Volleyball Serie A1.

DHL Modena
The following is the DHL Modena roster in the 2015–16 Men's Volleyball Serie A1.

Diatec Trentino
The following is the Diatec Trentino roster in the 2015–16 Men's Volleyball Serie A1.

Exprivia Molfetta
The following is the Exprivia Molfetta roster in the 2015–16 Men's Volleyball Serie A1.

Gi Group Monza
The following is the Gi Group Monza roster in the 2015–16 Men's Volleyball Serie A1.

LPR Piacenza
The following is the LPR Piacenza roster in the 2015–16 Men's Volleyball Serie A1.

Ninfa Latina
The following is the Ninfa Latina roster in the 2015–16 Men's Volleyball Serie A1.

Revivre Milano
The following is the Revivre Milano roster in the 2015–16 Men's Volleyball Serie A1.

Sir Safety Conad Perugia
The following is the Sir Safety Conad Perugia roster in the 2015–16 Men's Volleyball Serie A1.

Tonazzo Padova
The following is the Tonazzo Padova roster in the 2015–16 Men's Volleyball Serie A1.

References

External links
Official website

Volleyball in Italy
Men's volleyball in Italy
Volleyball squads
Men's volleyball squads